The 2009 BWF Super Series Masters Finals was a top level badminton competition which was held from December 2 to December 6, 2009 in Johor Bahru, Malaysia. The final was held by Badminton Association of Malaysia. It was the final event of the BWF Super Series competition on the 2009 BWF Super Series schedule. The total purse for the event was $500,000.

Representatives by nation

§: Nicole Grether from Germany and Charmaine Reid from Canada were the players who played in two categories (women's singles and women's doubles), Anthony Clark from England and Hendra Aprida Gunawan from Indonesia were the players who played in two categories (men's doubles and mixed doubles), while Kunchala Voravichitchaikul from Thailand was the only player who played in two categories (women's doubles and mixed doubles).

Performance by nation

Men's singles

Group A

Group B

Finals

Women's singles

Group A

Group B

Finals

Men's doubles

Group A

Group B

Finals

Women's doubles

Group A

Group B

Finals

Mixed doubles

Group A

Group B

Finals

References

BWF World Superseries Finals
Masters Finals
BWF Super Series Finals
Badminton tournaments in Malaysia